Henri Bacry (1928–2010) was Professor Emeritus at the Université de la Méditerranée. Henri Bacry was assistant of physics at the Faculté des Sciences d'Alger and then Professor of mathematics at Lycée Bugeaud, before becoming, in 1969, Professor at the Faculté des Sciences de Luminy. He was a visiting scholar at the Institute for Advanced Study in Princeton in 1966-6 and a researcher at CERN. He is the founder in 1972 of the International Colloquium of Group Theoretical Methods in Physics. He has numerous publications on theoretical physics, problems of symmetry in various fields ranging from relativity to particle physics, optics, physics of sound and statistical mechanics and some work in mathematics.

Selected publications
 with Jean-Marc Lévy-Leblond Possible Kinematics, J. Math. Phys., vol. 9, 1969, pp. 1605–1614  (discussed by Freeman Dyson his 1972 Gibbs Lecture Missed opportunities)
 Constellations and projective classical groups, Comm. Math. Pays., vol. 72, 1980, pp. 119–130 
 Group theory and constellations. Editions Publibook, 2004.

References

External links
Henri Bacry biography at www.canal-u.fr
Henri Bacry (1928–2010)

French physicists
Institute for Advanced Study visiting scholars
1928 births
2010 deaths
People associated with CERN